Prays endocarpa is a moth in the  family Plutellidae.Known by the common name Citrus pock caterpillar, the larvae are pests of Pomelo fruit.

External links
 Prays endocarpa at www.catalogueoflife.org.

References

Plutellidae
Moths described in 1919
Moths of Asia
Agricultural pest insects